War depictions in film and television include documentaries, TV mini-series, and drama serials depicting aspects of historical wars. The films included here are set in the time period from 1945 to 2001, or from the start of the Cold War until it came to an end in 1990s. The Cold War itself was the aftermath of World War II. At the turn of the new century the world woke up to a new reality one September morning and Cold War's aftermath period came to an end.

Indonesian National Revolution (1945–1949) 

 Darah dan Doa (1950)
 Enam Djam di Djogdja (1951)
 Kopral Djono (1954)
 Pedjuang (1960)
 Daerah Tak Bertuan (1963)
 Perawan di Sektor Selatan (1972)
 Mereka Kembali (1972)
 Bandung Lautan Api (1974)
 Janur Kuning (1979)
 Kereta Api Terakhir (1981)
 Serangan Fajar (1981)
 Pasukan Berani Mati (1982)
 Lebak Membara (1982)
 Film Dan Peristiwa (1985)
 Nagabonar (1986)
 Tjoet Nja' Dhien (1988)
 Soerabaja'45 (1990)
 Oeroeg (1993)
 Merah Putih (2009)
 Merah Putih II: Darah Garuda (2010)
 Laskar Pemimpi (2010)
 Merah Putih III: Hati Merdeka (2011)
 Battle of Surabaya (2015)
 Jenderal Soedirman (2015)
 The East (2020)

Cold War (1945–1991) 
(Also see Cold War films)

 The Stranger (1946)
 The Iron Curtain (1948)
 Berlin Express (1948)
 The Third Man (1949)
 The Big Lift (1950)
 Big Jim McLain (1952)
 The Iron Petticoat (1956)
 Jet Pilot (1957)
 Rocket Attack U.S.A. (1958)
 On the Beach (1959)
 The Manchurian Candidate (1962)
 A Gathering of Eagles (1963)
 Charade (1963)
 Seven Days in May (1964)
 Fail-Safe (1964)
 Dr. Strangelove or: How I Learned to Stop Worrying and Love the Bomb (1964)
 Rendezvous with a Spy ("Spotkanie ze Szpiegiem" in Polish) (1964)
 The War Game (1965)
 The Bedford Incident (1965)
 The Spy Who Came in from the Cold (1965)
 The Russians Are Coming, the Russians Are Coming (1966)
 Ice Station Zebra (1968)
 Topaz (1969)
 The Kremlin Letter (1970)
 The Looking Glass War (1970)
 Das unsichtbare Visier (1973–1979) (miniseries)
 Night Flight from Moscow (1973)
 The Mackintosh Man (1973)
 Starling and Lyre («Скворец и Лира» in Russian) (1974)
 Thirty Cases of Major Zeman (1974) (TV series)
 The Sell Out (1976)
 Telefon (1977)
 Twilight's Last Gleaming (1977)
 The Sandbaggers (1978–1980) (TV series)
 Firefox (1982)
 Incident at Map Grid 36-80 (1982)
 The Soldier (1982)
 World War III (1982) (miniseries)
 Enigma (1982)
 Gorky Park (1983)
 Spy Connection (1983)
 The Day After (1983) (TV)
 WarGames (1983)
 Red Dawn (1984)
 TASS Is Authorized to Declare... (1984) (miniseries)
 Threads (1984) (TV)
 Spies Like Us (1985)
 The Detached Mission (1985)
 The Falcon and the Snowman (1985)
 White Nights (1985)
 Defence of the Realm (1986)
 Interception («Перехват» in Russian) (1986)
 Top Gun (1986)
 The Fourth Protocol (1987)
 Game, Set and Match (1988) (miniseries)
 Honor Bound (1988)
 Red Scorpion (1988)
 Shootdown (1988)
 The Hunt for Red October (1990)
 By Dawn's Early Light (1990)
 The Fourth War (1990)
 Company Business (1991)
 Crimson Tide (1995)
 Akwarium (film) (1996)
 Hostile Waters (1997) (TV)
 The Assignment (1997)
 Cold War (1998) (TV documentary series)
 World War III (1998)
 Thirteen Days (2000)
 Buffalo Soldiers (2001)
 The Tunnel (2001)
 Confessions of a Dangerous Mind (2002)
 K-19: The Widowmaker (2002)
 Silmido (2003)
 Breach (2007)
 The Good Shepherd (2006)
 The Company (2007) (miniseries)
 Russian Translation (2007) (miniseries)
 A Lonely Place for Dying (2009)
 Carlos (2010) (miniseries)
 Knowledgeable source in Moscow («Осведомленный источник в Москве» in Russian) (2010)
 The Debt (2011)
 Tinker Tailor Soldier Spy (2011)
 Phantom (2013)
 The Americans (2013) (TV series)
 Despite the Falling Snow (2014)
 Jack Strong (2014)
 The Man Who Saved the World (2014) (docudrama)
 Pawn Sacrifice (2014)
 Bridge of Spies (2015)
 Deutschland 83 (2015) (TV series)
 The Man from U.N.C.L.E. (2015)
 Onset of Darkness (2016)
 Atomic Blonde (2017)
 The Death of Stalin (2017)
 Anna (2019)
 The Courier (2020)
 Firebird (2021)

Greek Civil War (1946–1949) 
 Guerrilla Girl (1953)
 Black Seed (1971)
 The Descent of the Nine (1984)
 Eleni (1985)
 Deep Soul (2009)

Hukbalahap Insurgency (1946–1954) 
 Huk sa Bagong Pamumuhay (1953)
 Huk! (1956)
 Patayin Si Sec. Magsaysay (1957)

Indochina Wars (1946–1989)

First Indochina War (1946–1954) 

 Rogues' Regiment (1948)
 A Yank in Indo-China (1952)
 Jump into Hell (1954)
 China Gate (1957)
 Patrouille de choc (1957)
 The Black Battalion (Cerný prapor) (1958) Czech soldiers in the Foreign legion
 Five Gates to Hell (1959)
 Fort du Fou (1963)
 Les Parias de la gloire (1964)
 La 317éme section (1965)
 Lost Command (1966)
 Le Crabe-tambour (1977)
 Indochine (1992)
 Dien Bien Phu (1992)
 The Quiet American (2002)
 The Indian (2011)
 To the Ends of the World (2018)

Vietnam War (1955–1975) 
(Also see Vietnam War in film and Vietnam War films)

 A Yank in Viet-Nam (1964)
 Operation C.I.A. (1965)
 To the Shores of Hell (1966)
 The Anderson Platoon (1967)
 Philcag in Vietnam (1967)
 The Green Berets (1968)
 The Ballad of Andy Crocker (1969)
 The Losers (1970) – see Nam's Angels
 Hearts and Minds (1974)
 The Deer Hunter (1978)
 Go Tell the Spartans (1978)
 Season of the Whirlwind (Mùa gió chướng) (1978)
 The Boys in Company C (1978)
 Coming Home (1978)
 Apocalypse Now (1979)
 The Odd Angry Shot (1979)
 The Wild Field (Cánh đồng hoang) (1979)
 A Rumor of War (1980) (TV)
 The Last Hunter (1980)
 The Ten Thousand Day War (1980) (TV miniseries)
 How Sleep the Brave (1981)
 Some Kind of Hero (1982)
 The Uncounted Enemy (1982)
 Don't Cry, It's Only Thunder (1982)
 Streamers (1983)
 Uncommon Valor (1983)
 Missing In Action (1984)
 Purple Hearts (1984)
 Cease Fire (1985)
 Missing In Action II: The Beginning (1985)
 Birdy (1985)
 Coordinates of Death (1985)
 Platoon (1986)
 Combat Shock (1986)
 Full Metal Jacket (1987)
 Good Morning, Vietnam (1987)
 Hamburger Hill (1987)
 Hanoi Hilton (1987)
 Tour of Duty (TV series) (1987–1990)
 Gardens of Stone (1987)
 Hell on the Battleground (1987)
 Strike Commando (1987)
 Thou Shalt Not Kill... Except (1987)
 Bat 21 (1988)
 Braddock: Missing in Action III (1988)
 China Beach (TV series) (1988–1991)
 Off Limits (1988)
 Platoon Leader (1988)
 Distant Thunder (1988)
 White Ghost (1988)
 Born on the Fourth of July (1989)
 Born to Fight (1989)
 Casualties of War (1989)
 The Siege of Firebase Gloria (1989)
 The Iron Triangle (1989)
 84C MoPic (1989)
 A Better Tomorrow 3 (1989)
 Air America (1990)
 Bullet in the Head (1990)
 Jacob's Ladder (1990)
 Flight of the Intruder (1991)
 White Badge (1992)
 Heaven & Earth (1993)
 Firehawk (1993)
 Forrest Gump (1994)
 The Foot Shooting Party (1994)
 Operation Dumbo Drop (1995)
 Dead Presidents (1995)
 The Walking Dead (1995)
 The War at Home (1996)
 A Bright Shining Lie (1998)
 Héroes de Otra Patria (Heroes Without a Cause) (1998)
 The Sound of the Violin in My Lai (1998)
 Tigerland (2000)
 Rules of Engagement (film)  (2000)
 Father Xmas (2001)
 Green Dragon (2001)
 Under Heavy Fire (2001)
 We Were Soldiers (2002)
 Word of Honor (2003)
 Gamma Squad (2004)
 R-Point (2004)
 Faith of My Fathers (2005)
 American Gangster (2007)
 Rescue Dawn (2007)
 Journey from the Fall (2007)
 1968 Tunnel Rats (2008)
 Sunny (2008)
 The Post (2017)
 Danger Close: The Battle of Long Tan (2019)
 The Greatest Beer Run Ever (2022)

Cambodian Civil War (1967–1975) 
 The Killing Fields (1984)
 The Road to Freedom (2010)
 First They Killed My Father (2017)

Sino-Vietnamese War (1979–1989) 
 Wreaths at the Foot of the Mountain (1984)
 Dove Tree (1985)
 Youth (2017)

Indo-Pakistani wars and conflicts (1947–present) 

 Param Vir Chakra (1990) DD Special Episodes on Indian war heroes and Martyrs.
 Border Hindustan Ka (2003)
 Ab Tumhare Hawale Watan Saathiyo (2004)
 War Chhod Na Yaar (2013)
 Nishan-e-Haider Series PTV Special Plays.
 Alpha Bravo Charlie  PTV drama serial.

Indo-Pakistani War of 1947 (1947) 
 Saya e Khuda e Zuljalal (2016)
 Gadar: Ek Prem Katha India and Pakistan partition of 1947 (2001)

Bengali Language Movement (1952) 
 Jibon Theke Neya (1952)

Indo-Pakistani War of 1965 (1965) 
 Prem Pujari  (1965)
 Upkaar   (1967)
 Operation Dwarka Based on naval operation commenced by the Pakistan Navy to attack the Indian coastal town of Dwarka on 7 September 1965 (1998)

East Pakistan-West Pakistan War of 1971 (1971) 

 Ora Egaro Jon (1971)
 Stop Genocide (1971), Documentary
 Arunodoyer Agnishakkhi (1972)
 Dhire Bohe Meghna (1973)
 Hindustan Ki Kasam 1971 war (1973)
 Aakraman 1971 war (1975)
 Vijeta 1971 war (1982)
 Muktir Gaan (1995), Documentary
 Border 1971 war (1997)
 Muktir Kotha (1999)
 Matir Moina (2002)
 Joyjatra (2004)
 Megher Pore Megh (2004)
 Shyamol Chhaya (2005)
 Amar Bondhu Rashed (2011)
 Guerilla (2011)
 Shongram (2014)
 The Ghazi Attack (2017)
 1971: Beyond Borders (2017)
 Bhuban Majhi (2017)
 Raazi (2018)

Insurgency in Jammu and Kashmir (1989–present) 

 Mission Kashmir Kashmir struggle (2000)
 Roza (1982)
 Tango Charlie (2005)
 Haider (2014)
 Picket 43 (2015)
 Uri: The Surgical Strike (2019)

Kargil War (1999) 
 LOC Kargil (2003)
 Lakshya (2004)
 Shershaah (2021)

 Arab–Israeli conflict (1948–present) 

 First Arab-Israeli War (1948–1949) 

 Hill 24 Doesn't Answer (1955)
 Exodus (1960)
 Cast a Giant Shadow (1966)
 Kedma (2002)
 O Jerusalem (2006)
 The Little Traitor (2007)
 Above and Beyond (2014)

 Second Arab–Israeli War (1956) 
 Sammy Going South (1963)
 Nasser 56 (1996)
 The Suez Crisis (1997), TV

 Third Arab–Israeli War (1967) 
 The Battle of Sinai (1968)
 Avanti Popolo (1986)
 Pour Sacha (1991)
 Six Days in June (2007), documentary

 Fourth Arab–Israeli War (1973) 
 The bullet is still in my pocket (1974)
 Sadat (1983), miniseries
 Kippur (2000)
 Ayyam El Sadat (2001)
 The War in October (2013), documentary
 Valley of Tears (2020), TV series

 First Intifada (1987–1993) 
 Rock the Casbah (2012)
 Oslo (2021)

 Second Intifada (2000–2005) 
 Private (2004)
 The Green Prince (2014), documentary

 2006 Lebanon War 
 Under the Bombs (2007)

 Gaza War (2008–09) 
 Tears of Gaza (2010), documentary

 Burmese insurgency (1948–present) 
 Beyond Rangoon (1995)
 Burma VJ (2009 documentary)
 Rambo (2008)
 The Lady (2011)

 Malayan Emergency (1948–1960) 

 The Planter's Wife (1952)
 Operation Malaya (1953)
 Windom's Way (1957)
 The 7th Dawn (1964)
 The Virgin Soldiers (1969)
 Stand Up, Virgin Soldiers (1977)
 Bukit Kepong (1981)

 Korean War (1950–1953) and Korean DMZ Conflict (1966–present) 
(Also see List of Korean War films)

 A Yank in Korea (1951)
 This is Korea! (1951)
 Air Cadet (1951)
 The Steel Helmet (1951)
 Korea Patrol (1951)
 Fixed Bayonets (1951)
 I Want You (1951)
 One Minute to Zero (1952)
 Retreat, Hell! (1952)
 Battle Zone (1952)
 Mr Walkie Talkie (1952)
 Korea (1952)
 Torpedo Alley (1952)
 Combat Squad (1953)
 Take the High Ground! (1953)
 The Glory Brigade (1953)
 Battle Circus (1953)
 Mission Over Korea (1953)
 Flight Nurse (1953)
 Sabre Jet (1953)
 Cease Fire (1953) (3-D)
 Batalyon Pilipino sa Korea (1954)
 Prisoner of War (1954)
 The Bamboo Prison (1954)
 The Bridges at Toko-Ri (1954)
 Dragonfly Squadron (1954)
 Men of the Fighting Lady (1954)
 An Annapolis Story (1955)
 Target Zero (1955)
 Battle Taxi (1955)
 Crèvecoeur (1955)
 Air Strike (1955)
 Hell's Horizon (1955)
 Love Is a Many-Splendored Thing (1955)
 A Hill in Korea (1956)
 Battle on Shangganling Mountain (1956)
 Hold Back the Night (1956)
 The Rack (1956)
 Sayonara (1957)
 Men in War (1957)
 Battle Hymn (1957)
 Time Limit (1957)
 Tank Battalion (1958)
 Jet Attack (1958)
 The Hunters (1958)
 Operation Dames (1959)
 Pork Chop Hill (1959)
 Battle Flame (1959)
 All the Young Men (1960)
 Marines, Let's Go (1961)
 Sniper's Ridge (1961)
 War Is Hell (1961)
 The Manchurian Candidate (1962)
 War Hunt (1962)
 The Nun and the Sergeant (1962)
 The Hook (1963)
 The Young and The Brave (1963)
 The Marines Who Never Returned (1963)
 The Iron Angel (1964)
 No Man's Land (1964)
 Sergeant Ryker (1968) (1963 television show)
 MASH (1970) Dark comedy highlighting the antics of army battlefield surgeons in wartime Korea
 The Reluctant Heroes (1971)
 M*A*S*H (1972–83) Comedy TV series loosely based on the 1970 film MASH
 MacArthur (1977)
 Unsung Heroes (1978–1981)
 Inchon (1982)
 Wolmi Island (1982) North Korean film
 Order No. 027 (Myung ryoung-027 ho) (1986)
 Field of Honor (1986), the Netherlands Battalion in Korea
 From 5 p.m to 5 a.m (1990) North Korean film 
 Shiri (1999)
 Joint Security Area (2000) An investigation of a DMZ skirmish that resulted in the deaths of two North Korean soldiers
 Silmido (2003) Story of a team of elite soldiers trained to assassinate Kim Il Sung in the 1960s
 Big Fish (2003) Reminiscences from the life of a story teller include his service as a paratrooper in the Korean War
 Double Agent (2003)
 Taegukgi (2004)
 Welcome to Dongmakgol (2005)
 Crossing the Line (2006) Documentary film about an American soldier at the DMZ who defected to North Korea in the 1960s
 Seoul 1945 (2006) (TV series) Childhood friendships are forged during the Japanese occupation of Korea and shattered by the Korean War
 Assembly (2007) A Chinese communist soldier fights in the Chinese Civil War and Korean War before searching for the bodies of his fallen men
 The Forgotten War (2009) Story of the 10th BCT, Philippine Expeditionary Forces To Korea members sent to Korea, from Inchon Landings to Battle of Yultong.
 Road No. 1 (2010) (TV series)
 71: Into the Fire (2010)
 Legend of the Patriots (2010) (TV series), remake of Comrades
 Secret Reunion (2010) Action thriller about North Korean and South Korean spies hunting each other in Seoul
 The Frontline (2011)
 The Interview (2014)
 Northern Limit Line (film) (2015)
 My War (2016)
 Operation Chromite (film) (2016)
 Ayla: The Daughter of War (2017)
 The Battle at Lake Changjin (2021) 
 Devotion (2022) 

 Mau Mau Uprising (1952–1960) 

 Mau-Mau (1955)
 Simba (1955)
 Safari (1956)
 Something of Value (1957)
 The Mark of the Hawk (1957) – ambiguous setting, based on the events in Kenya.
 Guns at Batasi (1964)
 Africa Addio (1966), documentary
 The Kitchen Toto (1987)

 Cuban Revolution (1953–1959) The Gun Runners (1959)
 Pier 5, Havana (1959)
 Cuban Rebel Girls (1959)
 Cuban Story (1959)
 I Am Cuba (1964)
 The Teacher (1977)
 Cuba (1979)
 A Successful Man (1985)
 Clandestinos (1987)
 Havana (1990)
 Fidel (2002) (TV)
 Dreaming of Julia (2003)
 638 Ways to Kill Castro (2006) (TV Documentary)
 Che: Part 1 (2008)

 Algerian War (1954–1962) 

 Escape from Sahara (1958)
 Die Flucht aus der Hölle (1960)
 Commando (1962)
 Le petit soldat (1963)
 The Little Soldier (1963)
 Peuple en marche (1963
 The Unvanquished (1963)
 Lost Command (1966)
 The Battle of Algiers (1966)
 Chronicle of the Years of Fire (1975)
 A Captain's Honor (1982)
 Nuit noire, 17 octobre 1961 (2005)
 Mon colonel (2006)
 Cartouches Gauloises (2007)
 Intimate Enemies (2007)
 Djinns (2010)
 Outside the Law (2010)
 What the Day Owes the Night (2012)
 Far from Men (2014)
 Le puits (2015)

 Hungarian Revolution of 1956 
 The Journey (1959)
 The Secret Ways (1961)
 Children of Glory (2006)
 The Company (2007) Miniseries

 Cyprus Emergency (1955–1959) 
 The High Bright Sun (1964)
 Rendezvous with Dishonour (1970)

 Colombian conflict (1960–present) 

 Clear and Present Danger (1994)
 Collateral Damage (2002)
 Guerrilla Girl (2005), documentary
 El cartel (TV series) (2008–2010)
 Inside: FARC Hostage Rescue (2008), documentary
 Greetings to the Devil (2011)
 The Snitch Cartel (2011)
 Escobar, el Patrón del Mal (TV series) (2012)
 Narcos (TV series) (2015–2016)
 Wild District (2018)
 Forgotten We'll Be (2020)

 Indian annexation of Goa (1961) 
 Saat Hindustani (1969)
 Trikal (1985)

 Dhofar Rebellion (1962–1976) 
 Killer Elite (2011)

 Sino-Indian War (1962) 

 Ratha Thilagam (1963)
 Haqeeqat (1964)
 Khamoshi (1969)
 Tubelight (2017)
 Subedar Joginder Singh (2018)
 Paltan (2018)

 Aden Emergency (1963–1967) 
 The Last Post (TV series) (2017)

 Modern  Wars in Sub-Saharan Africa (1960–1999 ) 
 Congo Crisis (1960–1966) 
 Dark of the Sun (1968)
 Lumumba (2000)
 Mister BOB (2011) (TV)
 Siege of Jadotville (2016)

 Eritrean War of Independence (1961–1991) 
 Heart of Fire (2008)

 Guinea-Bissau War of Independence (1963–1974) 
 Annos no assa luta (1976)
 Mortu Nega (1987)
 Xime (1994)
 The Two Faces of War (2004), documentary

 Rhodesian Bush War (1964–1979) 
 Albino (1976)
 A Game for Vultures (1979)
 Blind Justice (1988)
 Flame (1998)

 Chadian Civil War (1965–79) 
 The Passenger (1975)

 South African Border War / Namibian War of Independence (1966–1990) 
 Moffie (2019)
 Namibia: The Struggle for Liberation (2007)

 Nigerian Civil War (1967–1970) 
 Tears of the Sun (2003)
 Half of a Yellow Sun (2013)

 Angolan Civil War (1975–2002) 
 Escape from Angola (1976)
 The Gods Must Be Crazy II (1980)
 The Hero (2004)

 Chadian–Libyan conflict (1978–1987) 
 In the Army Now (1994)

 Uganda–Tanzania War (1978–1979) 
 Rise and Fall of Idi Amin (1981)

 Second Sudanese Civil War (1983–2005) 
 Machine Gun Preacher (2011)

 Lord's Resistance Army insurgency in Uganda (1987–present) 
 Kony 2012 (2012), documentary

 Somali Civil War (1988–present) 
 Black Hawk Down (2001)
 Captain Phillips (2013)
 The Pirates of Somalia (2017)
 Escape from Mogadishu (2021)

 First Liberian Civil War (1989–1997) 
 Freetown (2015)

 Rwandan Civil War (1990–1993) 

 Hotel Rwanda (2004)
 Shooting Dogs (2005)
 Sometimes in April (2005)
 Beyond The Gates (2005)
 A Sunday in Kigali (Un dimanche à Kigali) (2006)
 Primeval (2007)
 Shake Hands with the Devil (2007)

 Second Congo War (1998–2003) 
 War Witch (2012)

 Sierra Leone Civil War (1991–2002) 
 Cry Freetown (2000), documentary
 Blood Diamond (2006)
 Ezra (2007)
 La vita non perde valore (2012), documentary

 Second Liberian Civil War (1999–2003) 
 Lord of War (2005)
 Johnny Mad Dog (2008)
 Beasts of No Nation (2015)

 Indonesian killings of 1965–66 

 The Year of Living Dangerously (1982)
 Pengkhianatan G30 S/PKI (1984)
 Gie (2005)
 40 Years of Silence： An Indonesian Tragedy  (2009)
 Sang Penari (2011)
 The Act of Killing (2012), Documentary
 The Look of Silence (2014)

 Naxalite–Maoist insurgency in India (1967–present) 
 The Naxalites (1980)
 Aranyakam (1988)
 Red Alert: The War Within (2010)
 Chakravyuh (2012)

 Communist Insurgency of the Philippines (1969–present) 
 Ama Namin (1998)
 Huk! (1956)
 Ex-Army Ultimatum Ceasefire (1987)

 The Troubles in Northern Ireland (1969–2005) 

 The Outsider (1980)
 Harry's Game TV miniseries (1982)
 Cal (1984)
 A Prayer for the Dying (1987)
 Patriot Games (1992)
 The Crying Game (1992)
 In the Name of the Father (1993)
 Blown Away (1994)
 The Devil's Own (1997)
 The Boxer (1997)
 Resurrection Man (1998)
 H3 (2001)
 Bloody Sunday (2002)
 Battle of the Bogside documentary film (2004)
 Omagh (2004)
 Johnny Was (2006)
 Fifty Dead Men Walking (2008)
 Hunger (2008)
 '71 (2014)

 Islamic Insurgency of the Philippines (1970–present) 
 Mistah (Mga Mandirigma) (1994)
 Bagong Buwan (2001)

 Yugoslav counter-insurgency against Bugojno group (1972) 
 Brisani prostor (1985), TV series
 Balkanska pravila (1997)

 Turkish invasion of Cyprus (1974) 
 Kartal Yuvası (film) (1974)
 Tomorrow's Warrior (1981)
 Under the Stars (2001)
 The Palace (2011)

 Indonesian invasion of East Timor (1975–1976) 
 Balibo (2009)
 Beatriz's War (2013)

 Lebanese Civil War (1975–1990) 

 Circle of Deceit (1981)
 The Delta Force (1986)
 Witness in the War Zone (1987)
 Navy SEALs (1990)
 al-I'sar [in Arabic] (~1992)
 West Beirut (1998)
 Zozo (2005)

 First Lebanon War (1982) 

 Ricochets (Shtei Etzbaot Mi'Tzidon) (1986)
 Time for Cherries (Onat Haduvdevanim) (1991)
 Cup Final (1991)
 Beaufort (2007)
 Waltz with Bashir (2008)
 Lebanon (2009)

 War of the Camps (1985–1988) 
 Spy Game (2001)

 Operation Entebbe (1976) 

 Victory at Entebbe (1976) (TV)
 Mivtsa Yonatan (1977)
 Raid On Entebbe (1977) (TV)
 Rise and Fall of Idi Amin (1981)
 The Last King of Scotland (2006)
 Entebbe (2018)

 Nicaraguan Revolution (1961–1992) 
 Under Fire (1983)
 Last Plane Out (1983)
 Latino (1985)
 Carla's Song (1997)
 Kill the Messenger (2014)

 Soviet–Afghan War (1979–1989) and Afghan Civil War (1992–1996) 

 Days of Hell (1986)
 The Living Daylights (1987)
 All Costs Paid (1988), TV miniseries
 Rambo III (1988)
 The Beast of War (1988)
 Afghanistan – The last war bus (1989)
 Cargo 300 («Груз 300» in Russian) (1989)
 Afghan Breakdown (1991)
 Peshavar Waltz (1994), Russian war film on Afghanistan
 Spetsnaz (2002), TV miniseries
 9th Company (2005)
 Charlie Wilson's War (2007)
 The Kite Runner (2007)
 The Caravan Hunters («Охотники за караванами» in Russian) (2010), TV miniseries
 Kandagar (2010)
 Leaving Afghanistan (2019)

 Internal conflict in Peru (1980–present) 
 The Mouth of the Wolf (1988)

 Iran–Iraq War (1980–1988) 

 Ravayat-e Fath, a war documentary film
 A Military Base in Hell (1984)
 Eagles (1984)
 A Boat to the Beach (1985)
 Alhodood Almultahebah (The Flaming Borders) (1986)
 Sea Clamor (1987)
 The Marriage of the Blessed (1989)
 The Immigrant (1990)
 Snake Fang (1990)
 The Human Shield (1992)
 From Karkheh to Rhein (1992)
 The Glass Agency (1998)
 Big Drum Under Left Foot (2004)
 Duel (2004)
 Kilomètre Zéro (Kilometer Zero) (2005)
 Ekhrajiha (2007)
 The Night Bus (2007)
 Persepolis (2007)
 Ruz-e-sevom (The Third Day) (2007)
 Dar Chashm-e Baad (In the Wind's Eyes) (2008), TV series
 Shoghe parvaz (Passion for Flying) (2012–2013), TV series
 Che (2014)
 Track 143 (2014)
 Until Ahmed Returns (2014)
 Breath (2016)
 Under the Shadow (2016)
 The Lost Strait (2018)

 Salvadoran Civil War (1980–1992) 
 S.A.S. à San Salvador (1983)
 Salvador (1986)
 Romero (1989)
 Voces inocentes (2004) (Innocent Voices)

 Falklands War (1982) 

 Los Chicos De La Guerra (1984)
 Tumbledown (1988) (TV)
 Resurrected (1989)
 An Ungentlemanly Act (1992) (TV)
 Pozo de zorro (Fox hole) (1999)
 Iluminados Por El Fuego (Blessed by Fire) (2005)
 1982, Estuvimos ahí (1982, We were there) (2004)
 This Is England (2007)
 The Iron Lady (2011)
 Combatientes (Combatans) (2013) (TV) Soldado Argentino Solo Conocido por Dios (Soldiers Only Know by God) (2017) Sri Lankan Civil War (1983–2009) 
 Kannathil Muthamittal (2002)
 Sengadal (2010, not yet released, banned in India and Sri Lanka
 Madras Cafe (2013)
 A Private War (2018)

 US Invasion of Grenada (1983) 
 Heartbreak Ridge (1986)

 Al-Anfal Campaign (1986–1989) 
 Jiyan (2002)
 Kilomètre Zéro (Kilometer Zero) (2005)
 Sirta la gal ba (2009)
 Triage (2009)

 South Yemen Civil War (1986) 
 Russian Translation (2007), TV series

 First Nagorno-Karabakh War (1988–1994) 

 Aram (2002)
 A Trip to Karabakh (2005)
 Chakatagir (Destiny) (2006)
 A Story of People in War and Peace (2007), documentary
 Yaddaş (The Memory) (2010)
 Dolu (2012)
 If Only Everyone (2012)
 The Last Inhabitant (2016)

 United States invasion of Panama (1989–1990) 
 The Panama Deception (1992) (documentary)
 Noriega: God's Favorite (2000) (TV movie)
 Invasion (2014) (documentary)

 Gulf War (1990–1991) 
(Also see Gulf War films)

 Hot Shots! (1991)
 The Heroes of Desert Storm (1991)
 Lessons of Darkness (1992)
 The Human Shield (1992)
 The Finest Hour (1992)
 Courage Under Fire (1996)
 The One That Got Away (1996) (TV)
 Thanks of a Grateful Nation (1998) (TV)
 Three Kings (1999)
 Bravo Two Zero (1999) (TV)
 Live From Baghdad (2002) (TV)
 The Manchurian Candidate (2004)
 Jarhead (2005)
 Dawn of the World (2008)
 House of Saddam (2008) (TV)
 The Devil's Double (2011)
 Airlift (2016)

 Algerian Civil War (1991–2002) 
 Barakat! (2006)
 Of Gods and Men (2010)

 Yugoslav Wars (1991–1999) 
(also see List of Yugoslav Wars films)
 The Death of Yugoslavia (1995), documentary
 Yugoslavia: The Avoidable War (1999), documentary
 The Weight of Chains (2010), documentary
 Generacija 71 (Generation 71) (2011), feature, animation

 Ten-Day War in Slovenia (1991) 
 Sivi kamion crvene boje (Red Coloured Grey Truck) (2004)
 Silent Sonata (2011)

 Croatian War of Independence (1991–1995) 

 Dezerter (1992)
 Say Why Have You Left Me (1993)
 Vukovar poste restante (1994)
 Premeditated Murder (1995)
 How the War Started on My Island (1997)
 Vracanje (1997)
 The Wounds (1998)
 Celestial Body (2000)
 Harrison's Flowers (2000)
 Witnesses (2003)
 Yu (2003)
 Mathilde (2004)
 Oluja nad Krajinom (Storm over Krajina) (2001), documentary
 Sinovci (2006)
 The Recollection Thief (2007)
 Will Not End Here (2008)
 Zapamtite Vukovar (2008)
 The Blacks (2009)
 The Ghosts of Medak Pocket (2011), documentary
 Vir (The Whirl) (2012)
 Number 55 (2014)
 The High Sun (2015)
 Oluja (film) (2023)

 Bosnian War (1992–1995) 

 Before the Rain (1994)
 Underground (1995)
 Složna braća (1995), TV miniseries
 Ulysses' Gaze (1995)
 Pretty Village, Pretty Flame (1996)
 Welcome to Sarajevo (1997)
 The Perfect Circle (1997)
 Demons of War (1998)
 Savior (1998)
 Shot Through the Heart (1998)
 The Dagger (1999)
 Warriors (1999)
 No Man's Land (2001)
 Behind Enemy Lines (2002)
 Where Eskimos Live (2002)
 Fuse (2003)
 Life Is a Miracle (2004)
 Grbavica (2006)
 Nafaka (2006)
 The Fourth Man (2007)
 The Hunting Party (2007)
 Živi i mrtvi (2007)
 The Tour (2008)
 ZOS: Zone of Separation (2008), TV miniseries
 Sono stato Dio in Bosnia. Vita di un Mercenario (I was a God in Bosnia: Life of a Mercenary) (2010), documentary
 The Whistleblower (2010)
 A Town Betrayed (2011), documentary
 In the Land of Blood and Honey (2011)
 Neprijatelj (The Enemy) (2011)
 Sarajevo Ricochet (2011), documentary
 Circles (2013)
 Isteni műszak (Heavenly Shift) (2013)
 No One's Child (2014)
 So Hot Was the Cannon (2014)
 A Perfect Day (2015)
 L'Angelo di Sarajevo (2015), TV miniseries
 The Last Panthers (2015), TV series
 On the Milky Road (2016)
 Renegades (2017)
 Koridor 92 (2020), docudrama
 Te mračne noći (2021)

 Kosovo War (1998–1999) 

 The Valley (2000), documentary
 Guerreros (2002)
 Sniper 2 (2003)
 The Hunted (2003)
 Mörderischer Frieden (Sniper Valley) (2007)
 Stolen Kosovo (2008), TV documentary
 Kosovo: Can You Imagine? (2009), documentary
 My Beautiful Country (2012)
 Enclave (2015)
 Plani strategjik (2016), short
 The Balkan Line  (2019)
 War stories from Košare  (2019), TV docu-drama
 War stories from Paštrik  (2019), TV docu-drama
 Dossier Kosovo ’98 (2022), TV docu-drama

 NATO bombing of Yugoslavia (1999) 

 Sky Hook (2000)
 War Live (2000)
 Falling in the Paradise (2004)
 California Dreamin' (2007)
 Niko nije rekao neću (2008), TV docu-drama
 Mamaroš (2013)
 The Sky Above Us (2015)
 The Load (2018)
 The Balkan Line  (2019)
 Bauk (2023)

 Transnistria War (1992) 
 Carbon (2022)

 Civil war in Tajikistan (1992–1997) 
 Mama (1998)
 Nikto, krome nas...  (2008)
 Silent Border Post («Тихая застава» in Russian) (2011)
 The Death of Innocents ("Марги бегунох" in Tajik) (2013)

 War in Abkhazia (1992–93) 
 The Other Bank (2009)
 Konpliktis zona (Conflict Zone) (2009)
 Mandariinid (Tangerines) (2013)
 Corn Island (2014)
 House of Others (2016)

 First Chechen War (1994–1996) 

 Prisoner of the Mountains (1996)
 Damned and Forgotten (1997), documentary («Прокляты и забыты» in Russian)
 Purgatory (1997) («Чистилище» in Russian)
 Checkpoint (1998) («Блокпост» in Russian)
 Proof of Life (1998)
 Man's work (2001 TV series) («Мужская работа» in Russian)
 House of Fools (2002)
 The Storm Gate (2006 TV miniseries) («Грозовые ворота» in Russian)
 12 (2007)

 East Timorese crisis (1999) 
 Answered by Fire (2006) (TV)

 Second Chechen War (1999–2000) 

 War (2002)
 It is an honor («Честь имею» in Russian), miniseries (2004)
 Breakthrough («Прорыв» in Russian) (2006)
 Alexandra (2007)
 Captive (2008)
 Russian sacrifice («Русская жертва» in Russian) (2008)
 The Search (2014)

 Insurgency in the Republic of Macedonia (2001) 
 How I Killed a Saint ("Како убив светец" in Macedonian) (2004)
 Bal-Can-Can'' (2005)

See also 
List of war films and TV specials

References